Amrish Puri (22 June 1932 – 12 January 2005) was an Indian actor, who was an important figure in Indian theatre and cinema. He is remembered for playing iconic villainous roles in Hindi cinema as well as other Indian and international film industries. He remembered for playing various roles in variety of film genres, specially iconic villainous roles in Hindi Cinema, as well as International Cinema. His role as Mogambo in Shekhar Kapur's Hindi film Mr. India (1987) is considered as one of greatest villains of all time and to Western audiences he is best known as Mola Ram in Steven Spielberg's Hollywood film Indiana Jones and the Temple of Doom (1984).

While he predominantly worked in Hindi-language films, he had also appeared in Telugu, Kannada, Tamil, Malayalam and Marathi language films. Puri won three Filmfare Awards for Best Supporting Actor.

Films

References

External links
 Amrish Puri filmography at IMDb

Indian filmographies
Male actor filmographies